Hussein Ali Hussein Al-Aameri (born November 24, 1990) is an Iraqi judoka. He competed at the 2016 Summer Olympics in the men's 81 kg event, in which he was eliminated by Paul Kibikai in the second round.

References

1990 births
Living people
Iraqi male judoka
Judoka at the 2016 Summer Olympics
Olympic judoka of Iraq
Judoka at the 2010 Asian Games
Asian Games competitors for Iraq